Hilley is a surname. Notable people with the surname include:

Audrey Marie Hilley (1933–1987), American murderer
Dave Hilley (born 1938), Scottish footballer
Ed Hilley (1879–1956), American baseball player
Hugh Hilley (1899–1987), Scottish footballer
Joe Hilley (born 1956), American author